G.V.P. Samarasinghe, CCS was a Sri Lankan civil servant. He was the former Permanent Secretary of Defence and Foreign Affairs and Cabinet Secretary. Educated at the Royal College, Colombo, he is a graduate from the University College, Colombo.

References

Alumni of Royal College, Colombo
Alumni of the Ceylon University College
Sinhalese civil servants
Permanent secretaries of Sri Lanka